Robert Vincent (born 1981) is an English blues and country music singer-songwriter, born in the town of Crosby.

Vincent is prominent in the 'Americana' genre, with apparent influences from both country and blues singers. Vincent tours extensively, mainly in a support capacity as of 2015. Vincent's first album was released in download and two forms of physical CD.

Described by Andrew Harrison (editor of Q) as "the scouse Springsteen", Vincent is influenced by a range of music genres including Americana, 1970s English music and country music as well as his Merseyside roots. He toured extensively throughout 2012 as well as releasing a string of singles and EPs.

His debut album Life in Easy Steps was released by DB industries on 28 January 2013. His follow up, I'll Make The Most of My Sins was released in February 2017.

In 2020, the Ethan Johns produced album In This Town You're Owned was released. It went on to win the UK Americana Awards 'UK Album of the Year' and Vincent was named 'UK Artist of the Year'.

References

1976 births
Living people
Blues singer-songwriters
British country singers
Musicians from Liverpool
21st-century British singers